The Leaky Cauldron may refer to:

 The Leaky Cauldron (pub), a fictional pub in Harry Potter
 The Leaky Cauldron (website), a Harry Potter fan site named after the pub

fr:Lieux dans l’univers de Harry Potter#Chemin de Traverse